The East River is an , primarily tidal river located in Mathews County in the Middle Peninsula region of Virginia. It flows into Mobjack Bay, which in turn empties into the Chesapeake Bay.

See also
List of rivers of Virginia

References

Tributaries of the Chesapeake Bay
Rivers of Virginia
Rivers of Mathews County, Virginia